Stan Ridgway (1915-1985) was an Australian rugby league footballer who played in the 1930s and 1940s. He played in the NSWRFL premiership for North Sydney as a fullback.

Playing career
Ridgway began his first grade career in 1932.  Ridgway played at fullback in North's 1943 grand final defeat against Newtown which would prove to be the club's last grand final appearance before exiting the competition in 1999.  Ridgway retired at the end of the 1944 season. He finished his career at Cessnock, New South Wales for the 1945 season.

References

North Sydney Bears players
Rugby league fullbacks
Rugby league players from Sydney
1915 births
1985 deaths